Mama Moluh (born 26 March 1958) is a Cameroonian sprinter. He competed in the men's 400 metres at the 1984 Summer Olympics.

References

1958 births
Living people
Athletes (track and field) at the 1984 Summer Olympics
Cameroonian male sprinters
Olympic athletes of Cameroon
Place of birth missing (living people)